Badileyan (also Romanized as Badīleyān and Badīlīān; also known as Badīlī and Shahrak-e Badīlīān) is a village in Kheybar Rural District, Choghamish District, Dezful County, Khuzestan Province, Iran. At the 2006 census, its population was 400, in 75 families.

References 

Populated places in Dezful County